The Kengal Hanumanthaiya  Memorial Trust is a non-profit Charitable Trust that is dedicated to the ideals of Kengal Hanumanthaiya, the first elected Chief Minister of Karnataka, India, and the second to hold that position after KC Reddy who was nominated. In addition to the 5 Trustees, 3 of whom are from Kengal Hanumanthaiya's family, the Trust also has over 150 members from different walks of life who have one thing in common -  Social Work. There are over 25 members of the present (and past) Karnataka Legislative Assembly who are members of the Trust. In keeping with the objectives of the Trust, all members are included irrespective of caste, community or any political or religious affiliations. The members of the Karnataka Legislative Assembly who are members are across the political spectrum from the Indian National Congress (INC), Bharatiya Janata Party (BJP), Janata Party (S), and Independents.

Mission and Objectives 
The Kengal Hanumanthaiya Trust has adopted the objectives as enumerated by Kengal Hanumanthaiya himself in that it should:

 To promote, propagate, or otherwise disseminate the ideals of liberty, equality, fraternity, social justice and parliamentary democracy in India 
 To achieve this by building institutions with the same objectives and structures that adhere to the principles mentioned above
 To ensure that there is no discrimination whatsoever based on caste, creed, colour or sex
 To promote and establish educational institutions, particularly in the sports arena or otherwise
 To Institute studentship, scholarships, and the like to encourage deserving students and provide monetary help and assistance

Initiatives 

The Kengal Hanumanthaiya Memorial Trust shortly after its inception organised the 104th birth celebration of Kengal Hanumantiaiya in 2012 The function was presided by HE Pranab Mukherjee, the 13th President of India (then Finance Minister) in Bangalore, who called Hanumanthaiya a "towering personality and the architect of Karnataka"

The Chief Minister of Karnataka (then Leader of the Opposition) in 2010, the Hon. Siddaramaiah mentioned that Kengal  Hanumanthaiya's ideas are still worth emulating in this day and age.

References

India-focused charities
Charities based in India
2009 establishments in Karnataka